Joel Wiens Stadium is a sport stadium in Hillsboro, Kansas, United States. that opened in 2009, replacing Reimer Stadium.  The facility is primarily used by the Tabor College and Hillsboro high school athletic teams.  The stadium is also used for local high school sporting events and other community events.  Ownership and operations of the facility are shared by both Tabor College and Hillsboro USD 410.

References

External links
 Tabor College - official website
 Tabor Campus Map
 Hillsboro City Map - KDOT

American football venues in Kansas
Buildings and structures in Marion County, Kansas
2009 establishments in Kansas